Beginning in the late 1950s the United States aircraft company Bay Aviation (formerly Oakland Airmotive) produced nine twin-engine conversions of the Beechcraft Bonanza called the Super "V" Bonanza. After production was shifted to Canada in 1962, five more aircraft were built for a total production run of fourteen. The basis of the conversion was the early Model 35 Bonanza with the original small V-tail surfaces. The Super-V competed with Beechcraft's own Travel Air twin-engine Bonanza derivative.

History

Development 
The Super-V is an extensive conversion of the Beechcraft Model 35 Bonanza. Serial number records indicate the aircraft chosen for conversion range in production dates from 1947 to 1950. The original conversion was developed by David Peterson as the "Skyline Super-V" in 1955–56, assisted by W.D. Johnson, and the rights to the conversion were acquired by Oakland Airmotive on July 2, 1958. Oakland Airmotive became Bay Aviation Services on July 8, 1960. The main wing spar was strengthened considerably in the process. The airframe is so different from the original Bonanza that, rather than supplementing the original type certificate, the US Federal Aviation Administration (FAA) issued a completely new certificate for the Super-V.

Oakland Airmotive intended to produce converted planes starting in 1960, but never progressed beyond manufacturing and installing Super-V conversion kits on customer-supplied Bonanzas. Ed Gough was the President. FAA type certification was granted in June 1960. Production drawings, bills of material, and other documentation was prepared and there were several conversions in the pipeline. Flying magazine published a story on the Super V in October 1960 and the marketing efforts were reaching a peak, with a Super-V (Registration N617B) completing a successful circumnavigation of the globe.

The Super-V was initially certificated with the carburetor-equipped Lycoming O-360-A1A engines. Although the engines were intended to be fuel-injected, as on David Peterson's developmental prototype, the engines on the prototype did not meet FAA approval. As a preliminary first step towards true fuel injection, the O-360-A1C engine was adopted in August 1960, which eliminated the possibility of carburetor icing. The type certificate was later revised to include the A1C engine variant, and flight testing with O-360-A1C engines was not completed until early 1961 at SFO.

The Insul-8 Corporation of San Carlos, California, organized a new aviation division that provided all parts (except engines) for the conversion to the Super-V Aircraft Corporation of San Francisco International Airport. Super-V conversion centers operated under franchise from the Super-V Aircraft Corporation. Tirey L. Ford, Jr., was president of both the Insul-8 Corporation and the Super-V Aircraft Corporation.

Early accidents
The sales manager, Kenneth Bellamy, was killed in a crash fifteen miles southeast of Brighton, Colorado, while demonstrating the Super V to a potential buyer, Don Vest, founder of Vest Aircraft Company on September 14, 1960. A crop-duster pilot, John Curry, was also killed in the crash. It was believed that Vest was at the controls of the Super-V at the time of the crash.

The Super-V belonging to Southland Corporation, a distributor for Bay Aviation Services, crashed on August 12, 1961, near Ardmore, Oklahoma, with at least one survivor.

Shifting production
It is likely the relatively high cost of the Super-V conversion and competition from the Beechcraft Travel Air, a factory-built twin-engine aircraft of comparable role and size, resulted in low demand for the Super-V. This, coupled with workmanship issues and early crashes, led to the rapid dissolution of Bay Aviation. Bay Aviation became Lawrence Properties in 1962.

Production was transferred to Fleet Aircraft in 1962 with some detail improvements to fulfill existing orders. A separate type certificate was issued for planes manufactured by Fleet in Canada, this time with O-360-A1D engines. The production rights were sold again to Mitchell Aircraft in 1963. The current type certificate holder is KWAD Company.

Specific aircraft

The complete Super-V serial number consists of the converted Super-V serial number (in the format SV###) accompanied by the Beech donor plane serial number (D####). Super-V serial numbers were assigned sequentially starting from SV101. Serial numbers as high as SV117 are known to exist; SV101 was later rebuilt into SV116, and SV110 and SV111 were skipped, hence known production is fourteen aircraft. Of the fourteen, nine were built by Bay Aviation (of which five have been destroyed, two still hold current registration, and two have unknown disposition) and five were built by Fleet Aircraft (of which two have been destroyed, one still holds current registration, and two have unknown disposition).

Specifications

See also

References

External links 

Super V
1950s United States civil utility aircraft
Low-wing aircraft
V-tail aircraft
Aircraft first flown in 1956
Twin piston-engined tractor aircraft